The Arconce is a  long river in the Saône-et-Loire department in central France.

It flows generally southwest, but north from Anzy-le-Duc to its mouth, with numerous meanders.

Communes along its course
The following communes are ordered from source to mouth : Mary, Gourdon, Le Rousset, Marizy, Ballore, Mornay, Martigny-le-Comte, Viry, Charolles, Changy, Lugny-lès-Charolles, Saint-Julien-de-Civry, Nochize, Poisson, Varenne-l'Arconce, Saint-Didier-en-Brionnais, Sarry, Anzy-le-Duc, Montceaux-l'Étoile, Versaugues, L'Hôpital-le-Mercier, Saint-Yan, Varenne-Saint-Germain

References

Rivers of France
Rivers of Bourgogne-Franche-Comté
Rivers of Saône-et-Loire